Max Lewandowsky (28 June 1876 – 4 April 1916) was a German neurologist, who was a native of Berlin, born into a Jewish family.

Personal life 
Lewandowsky studied medicine at the Universities of Marburg, Berlin and Halle, earning his medical doctorate at Halle in 1898. In 1902 he obtained his post-graduate qualification for physiology, and in 1904, received training in clinical neurology and psychiatry under Karl Bonhoeffer and Franz Nissl at the University of Heidelberg. Afterwards he travelled to Paris, where he studied under neurologist Pierre Marie. Beginning in 1905 he worked in the Berlin-Friedrichshain hospital. During World War I he became infected with typhus and died.

Academic contributions 
Lewandowsky coined the term "Blood–brain barrier" in 1900, referring to the hypothesized semipermeable membrane which separated the human central nervous system from the rest of the body's vasculature, and which prevented the entry of certain compounds from entering the brain when injected into the bloodstream. Two years earlier, researchers Arthur Biedl and R. Kraus had formed a similar hypothesis when low-concentration "bile salts" failed to affect behavior (and thus, in theory, had failed to enter the brain) when injected into the bloodstream of animals.

Beginning in 1910 he, together with Alois Alzheimer, edited the journal Zeitschrift für die gesamte Neurologie und Psychiatrie. He was also editor of a handbook of neurology, Handbuch der Neurologie (1910–14).

References
 

German neurologists
1876 births
1916 deaths
19th-century German Jews
Physicians from Berlin
People from the Province of Brandenburg
University of Marburg alumni
Humboldt University of Berlin alumni
University of Halle alumni
Deaths from typhus